"Are You All Ready" is a song recorded by English singer Shakila Karim. It was released on 28 August 2012.

Background and composition
"Are You All Ready" is the fourth single by Shakila Karim. The song was intended to inspire the athletes competing in London 2012 Paralympics Games.

References

External links

2012 singles
2012 songs
British pop songs
Shakila Karim songs